Scherstetten is a municipality  in the district of Augsburg in Bavaria in Germany.

References

Augsburg (district)